Ian Clarke is a physician, missionary, philanthropist, entrepreneur, and politician in Uganda. Since May 2011, he has been mayor of Makindye Division, one of the five administrative units of the Kampala Capital City Authority.

Background and education
Clarke was born in South Armagh, Northern Ireland in 1952 to Thomas and Jean Clarke. He studied human medicine at Queen's University Belfast, graduating in 1976 with a Bachelor of Medicine and Bachelor of Surgery and a Bachelor of Obstetrics, as is customary in Irish medical schools. In 1987, he obtained a Diploma in Tropical Medicine and Hygiene from the Liverpool School of Tropical Medicine (LSTM). He followed up in 1994 with a Master of Science in Public Health, also from LSTM.

Moved to Uganda
Clarke read about the AIDS epidemic in Uganda and decided to come see for himself. He was taken to Kiwoko Village in present-day Nakaseke District in the Luweero Triangle. He arrived in 1987, at the tail end of the Ugandan Bush War, which he had been unaware of until he arrived. He subsequently returned with his family under the auspices of the Church Mission Society to work in Kiwoko. Clarke initially treated his patients under a tree before going on to establish Kiwoko Hospital which, as of March 2015, maintained a nurses training school, a laboratory technician training school, a large community health programme, a neonatal ICU, and full general hospital facilities.

Clarke later moved to Kampala, setting up his first clinic (International Medical Centre) within the Kampala Pentecostal Church Building (Watoto Church) on Buganda Road in Central Kampala. His vision continued to grow and he subsequently opened International Hospital Kampala (IHK) in Old Kampala where the first open heart surgery was carried out. IHK subsequently grew and moved to Namuwongo, another Kampala suburb. The 110 bed facility is the only ISO certified hospital in Uganda and strives to continue bridging the gap in private healthcare provision in Uganda through providing quality, affordable healthcare. The hospital has state-of-the-art facilities including specialties such as obstetrics and gynecology, pediatrics, and plastic surgery.

Other responsibilities
Clarke also writes a weekly column in The New Vision, Uganda's biggest daily, and has penned two books entitled The Man With The Key Has Gone and How Deep Is This Pothole. He has further projects in Juba, South Sudan and in Zanzibar, Tanzania where his family built, owns, and operates a boutique hotel. His wife Roberta Clarke, lives with him in Kampala. Their oldest son Sean oversees the approximately 12 clinics that his father owns in Uganda. Their daughter Lauren is a nurse and lives in Ireland. Their youngest son Michael runs the family hotel in Zanzibar.

Political career
In November 2010, Clarke entered Ugandan politics by securing nomination, as an independent candidate, to contest for the chairmanship of Makindye Division, one of the five divisions of the Kampala Capital City Authority, the governing body of Uganda's capital city of Kampala. He was motivated to run due to the bad roads and poor living conditions within his community. His three pillars in the election were: "good roads, good health and economic development". He enjoyed a landmark victory and was sworn into office as mayor in May 2011 to serve for a five-year term.

Affiliated businesses
Clarke is chairman and chief executive officer of the International Medical Group. In January 2014, unofficial estimates put the value of Clarke's businesses at US$15 million.

See also
 Hospitals in Uganda
 Makindye

References

1952 births
People from Armagh (city)
Politicians from Northern Ireland
Businesspeople from Northern Ireland
Ugandan healthcare chief executives
Living people
20th-century Ugandan physicians
Mayors of places in Uganda
Christian medical missionaries
British emigrants to Uganda
People from Kampala District
British Anglican missionaries
Academic staff of Clarke International University
Businesspeople in education
Businesspeople in agriculture
Businesspeople in the hospitality industry
Anglican missionaries in Uganda
Medical doctors from Northern Ireland
21st-century Ugandan physicians